A Swingin' Christmas is a Christmas album by Tony Bennett, released in 2008, that features the Count Basie Big Band. Bennett's daughter Antonia duets with him on one track.

The album received a Grammy Award nomination for Best Traditional Pop Vocal Album at the 52nd Grammy Awards.

Marketing campaign
To promote the release of the album Bennett granted numerous interviews, and made a number of television show performances, from the time of its release through the holiday season.  This included a special free street performance outside of Bloomingdale's department store at 4:30 p.m. on November 20 in New York City in which he performed three songs – "I'll Be Home for Christmas," "Santa Claus Is Coming to Town" and "Jingle Bells" – before the unveiling of the store's window displays.  He performed a concert at New York City's Apollo Theater on December 16 that was billed as his only show in support of the album with the Count Basie Big Band.

Track listing
 "I'll Be Home for Christmas" (Gannon, Kent, Ram) [2:12]
 "Silver Bells" (Evans, Livingston) [3:17]
 "All I Want for Christmas Is You (A Christmas Love Song)" (Alan Bergman, Marilyn Bergman, Johnny Mandel) [4:18]
 "My Favorite Things" (Oscar Hammerstein II, Richard Rodgers) [2:55]
 "Christmas Time Is Here" (Guaraldi, Mendelson) [3:59]
 "Winter Wonderland" (Bernard, Smith) [2:31]
 "Have Yourself a Merry Little Christmas" (Blane, Martin) [4:36]
 "Santa Claus Is Coming to Town" (Coots, Gillespie) [2:53]
 "I've Got My Love to Keep Me Warm" – with Antonia Bennett (Berlin) [3:31]
 "The Christmas Waltz" (Cahn, Styne) [3:22]
 "O Christmas Tree" (Traditional) [3:27]

Versions
Many retailers featured different variations:
 Target carried an edition featuring a bonus DVD with a documentary on the making of the album as well as a host of concert performances.
 FYE carried an edition featuring a bonus DVD with a documentary on the making of the album as well as a special holiday-themed postcard reproducing Bennett's artwork.
 Borders carried an edition with ten of Bennett's holiday-themed artwork postcards.
 Barnes & Noble carried an edition with Bennett's version of "Christmas Auld Lang Syne" exclusive to the retailer. B&N also carried a deluxe version with a DVD and the exclusive track.
 Bloomingdale's carried an edition with Bennett's version on "Jingle Bells", exclusive to the retailer.

Personnel
 Tony Bennett – vocals
 Monty Alexander – piano
 Lee Musiker – piano (7, 9, 11)
 Gray Sargent – guitar
 Paul Langosch – double bass
 Harold Jones – drums

The Count Basie Orchestra
 Grant Langford – alto saxophone
 Marshall McDonald – alto saxophone
 Doug Lawrence – tenor saxophone
 Doug Miller – tenor saxophone
 John Williams – baritone saxophone
 Scotty Barnhart – trumpet
 Kris Johnson – trumpet
 Michael Williams – trumpet
 James Zollar – trumpet
 Clarence Banks – trombone
 Barry Cooper – trombone
 Dave Keim – trombone
 Alvin Walker – trombone

Production
 Danny Bennett – executive producer
 Phil Ramone – producer
 Dae Bennett – recording, mixing
 Alessandro Perrotta – assistant engineer
 Travis Stefl – assistant engineer
 Bob Ludwig – mastering

Charts

Weekly charts

Year-end charts

References

Tony Bennett albums
Count Basie Orchestra albums
2008 Christmas albums
Albums produced by Phil Ramone
Christmas albums by American artists
Swing Christmas albums
Collaborative albums
Columbia Records Christmas albums